The Little White Cloud That Cried is a German-Canadian experimental short film, directed by Guy Maddin and released in 2009. A tribute to underground filmmaker Jack Smith's 1963 film Flaming Creatures, it is a 16 mm film depicting a fantasia in which sea goddesses rise up out of the water to engage in an orgiastic battle. Writer and performer Lexi Tronic described the film as "the story of religious battles in an androgynous world, where everyone is trans-tabulous."

The cast includes Breanna Rose Taylor, Marcia Ferreira, Eric Wood, Lexi Tronic, Teresa Braun, Zsa Zsa LaBitche and Sex Party Marty.

The film premiered on October 28, 2009, at Five Flaming Days in a Rented World, a Smith tribute festival and conference in Berlin, and had its first Canadian screening on November 28, 2009, in Winnipeg, Manitoba.

It was subsequently named to TIFF's year-end Canada's Top Ten list for 2010.

References

External links

2009 films
2009 short films
2009 LGBT-related films
Canadian avant-garde and experimental short films
Canadian LGBT-related short films
German short films
German LGBT-related films
Films directed by Guy Maddin
Transgender-related films
2000s English-language films
2000s Canadian films
2000s German films